Shikma Prison is an Israeli prison located in Ashkelon.

There are many Palestinian prisoners there including the engineer Dirar Abu Sisi who was kidnapped in Ukraine in February 2011. Among the former prisoners is Israeli scientist Mordechai Vanunu.

References 

Prisons in Israel
Buildings and structures in Ashkelon